Massac may refer to several places in the United States:

 Massac, Kentucky
 Massac County, Illinois
 Fort Massac, Massac County, Illinois

Massac is the name or part of the name of several communes in France:
 Massac, Aude, in the Aude département
 Massac, Charente-Maritime, in the Charente-Maritime département
 Massac-Séran, in the Tarn département
 Massiac, Communes of the Cantal département, is the origin of the "Massac" name in Illinois.